The Verified Carbon Standard (VCS), formerly the Voluntary Carbon Standard, is a standard for certifying carbon emissions reductions. VCS is administered by Verra, a 501(c)(3) organization.

In 2023, an investigation by The Guardian, Die Zeit, and SourceMaterial, a non-profit investigative journalism outlet, found that about 94% of the rainforest carbon offsets provided by Verra are worthless and that the standard may worsen global heating.

History 
In 2005, carbon markets investment advisory firm Climate Wedge and its partner Cheyne Capital designed and drafted the first version (version 1.0) of the Voluntary Carbon Standard, intended as a quality standard for transacting and developing "non-Kyoto" Protocol carbon credits, namely voluntary carbon emissions reductions from greenhouse gas reduction projects that met the quality and verification standards of the UNFCCC Kyoto Protocol's Clean Development Mechanism (CDM) carbon offset mechanism, but were not eligible due to geographic or timing constraints of the Kyoto rulebook (e.g. carbon offset projects in the USA, Hong Kong, Turkey, etc that were not eligible for the CDM).  

In March 2006, Climate Wedge and Cheyne Capital transferred the Voluntary Carbon Standard version 1.0 to The Climate Group, International Emissions Trading Association (IETA) and World Economic Forum, and provided the initial sponsor capital for these non-profit organizations to subsequently convene a team of global carbon market experts to further draft the VCS requirements. The World Business Council for Sustainable Development (WBCSD) joined later on. The team later formed the VCS Steering Committee, which worked to draft the second and subsequent versions of the VCS Standard.

In 2008, the Board of Directors named David Antonioli the organization’s first Chief Executive Officer. In 2009, VCS incorporated in Washington D.C. as a non-profit non-governmental organization.

On February 15, 2018, the organization that maintains the Verified Carbon Standard changed its name from Verified Carbon Standard to Verra.

Criticism 
A 2021 study by The Guardian newspaper and Unearthed reported that Verra’s carbon offsetting standard was flawed. Accredited forest protection projects were using inconsistent predictive methods and overstating their emissions reductions. 11 of the 12 projects studied showed no difference in emissions compared to control groups. The study said the findings raised doubts about the validity of the carbon offsetting market. Verra said the investigation was “profoundly flawed”. It pointed out that the standard is under a continual process of amendment in alignment with the latest scientific best practice and in support of government-led efforts to halt deforestation. 

A nine-month investigation published on January 18, 2023 by The Guardian, Die Zeit, and SourceMaterial, a non-profit investigative journalism organization, found that approximately 94% of the rainforest carbon offsets provided by Verra  –  which accounted for about 40% of all credits it approved – are worthless.They also found that the credit scheme may worsen global heating and that the deforestation threat for Verra projects was overstated by 400% on average. At one of Verra's project sites in Peru, residents complained about being forcefully evicted from their homes, which were then demolished. The investigation was based on two peer-reviewed studies, one by a group of University of Cambridge scientists and the other from a team of international researchers. Verra denied the claims, criticizing the methodology of the studies as flawed and unrepresentative of the actual conditions of the projects.

See also
 Climate, Community & Biodiversity Alliance
 Carbon accounting
Carbon dioxide removal

References

External links
 Verified Carbon Standard
 Verra
 VCS Project Database
 Woodland Carbon Code - About the Code (UK government)
 Community guidelines for accessing forestry voluntary carbon markets (FAO)
 The Verified Carbon Standard profile on database of market governance mechanisms

Carbon finance